Ryan Nyambe (born 4 December 1997) is a Namibian professional footballer who plays as a defender for EFL Championship side Wigan Athletic. He previously played for Blackburn Rovers, making over 150 first team appearances for the club, and is also an international footballer for the Namibia national team.

Early life
Nyambe was born in Katima Mulilo, Namibia, raised by his aunt and uncle in the absence of his mother, who had moved to England in search of education. He moved to Manchester to join her at the age of ten in 2008.

Club career

Blackburn Rovers

Having previously played football for his school whilst living in Namibia, he joined a local team shortly after moving to England before joining the Blackburn Rovers academy in 2011 aged 13.

On 1 July 2015, it was announced that Nyambe had signed his first professional deal, agreeing to a three-year-deal with Blackburn that would run until 30 June 2018. Just over a month later, on 11 August, Nyambe made his professional debut, being named in Blackburn's starting-eleven for their first round EFL Cup fixture against League One side Shrewsbury Town. Nyambe assisted Nathan Delfouneso's 30th minute equaliser, although Blackburn went on to lose the game 2-1, and were ultimately knocked out of the cup.

On 19 November 2016, Nyambe made his league debut for Blackburn, coming on as a 77th minute substitution for Danny Graham in a 3-2 Championship victory over Brentford. His first league start came two weeks later, on 3 December, in a 1-1 draw with Huddersfield Town. Despite the 2016–17 season being one to forget, as Blackburn were relegated to League One, Nyambe came away from the season with 31 competitive appearances and the club's Young Player of the Year award.

On 21 July 2017, it was announced that Nyambe had agreed a new three-year-deal with the club, with the optional for a further 12-months. After a disastrous season the season before, Nyambe helped Blackburn achieve promotion back to the Championship after finishing runners-up to Wigan Athletic in League One at the end of the 2017–18 season. Nyambe made 35 appearances in all competitions for the club, despite suffering a hamstring injury in March 2018. Reflecting on Blackburn's promotion, Nyambe stated: "I'm very proud and it was great to enjoy the occasion with the fans."

On 23 April 2019, Blackburn announced that Nyambe had signed a new two-year contract with the club, with the option for an additional year that would see the player's stay at Blackburn be extended until the summer of 2022.

Wigan Athletic
Following the expiry of his contract with Blackburn, Nyambe joined Wigan Athletic on a one-year deal.

International career
Being eligible to represent both England and Namibia, Nyambe confirmed his commitment to play for Namibia, the country of his birth, at international level in May 2019. He was called up by Namibia for the first time in June, being selected for a warm-up friendly against Ghana on 9 June in Dubai, a game in which he made his international debut. Following the game, Namibia manager Ricardo Mannetti selected Nyambe as part of the squad for the 2019 Africa Cup of Nations.

He made his competitive debut for his national side in a group stage game against Morocco on 23 June. Despite the side losing 1-0, Nyambe was credited as having a man-of-the-match performance, despite playing in centre-back, as opposed to his usual right-back position. Nyambe featured in all of Namibia's group stage matches, with the country finishing at the bottom of its group, thus not progressing to the next stage of the tournament.

Missing the nation's three games that followed its Africa Cup of Nations campaign, Nyambe returned to the national team setup in November - being called up for the team's 2021 Africa Cup of Nations qualifiers against Chad and Guinea, games of which he played in both. After a year of being out of the Namibia setup due to the ongoing COVID-19 pandemic, Nyambe returned for his national side on 13 November 2020 for the nation's game against Chad, which it went on to lose 1-0. Nyambe would be faced with yet another year of being unable to play for Namibia, eventually returning in November 2021 for the side's 2022 World Cup qualifiers against Congo and Togo.

Playing style
Nyambe has said that he models his playing style on that of Rio Ferdinand. He is primarily a right-back, but can also play at centre-back, a position which he often features in for Namibia, and also at left-back.

Personal life
Nyambe is a Manchester United fan.

Career statistics

Club

International

Honours
Blackburn Rovers
EFL League One runner-up: 2017–18

References

External links

1997 births
Living people
People from Katima Mulilo
Namibian men's footballers
Namibia international footballers
2019 Africa Cup of Nations players
Namibian emigrants to the United Kingdom
Blackburn Rovers F.C. players
Association football defenders
English Football League players
Wigan Athletic F.C. players
Namibian expatriate footballers
Namibian expatriate sportspeople in England